Gardner Farmstead, on Licking Station Rd. near Salyersville, Kentucky was listed on the National Register of Historic Places in 2015.

The main house was built c.1830 as a two-story dog-trot log house built of half-dovetail notched logs, and evolved to be a five-bay I-house with a rear ell.

References

Houses on the National Register of Historic Places in Kentucky
National Register of Historic Places in Magoffin County, Kentucky
1830 establishments in Kentucky
Houses completed in 1830
I-houses in Kentucky
Dogtrot architecture in Kentucky
Log houses in the United States
Log buildings and structures on the National Register of Historic Places in Kentucky